Joseph or Joe Simpson may refer to:
Joe Simpson (rugby union, born 1856) (1856–1911), English rugby union player
Joe Simpson (footballer), association football fullback who played for Lincoln City in the 1890s
Joseph Simpson (artist) (1879–1939), British painter and etcher of portraits and sporting subjects
Bullet Joe Simpson (1893–1973), Canadian ice hockey player
Sir Joseph Simpson (police officer) (1909–1968), British police officer, Commissioner of the Metropolitan Police, 1958–1968
Joe Simpson (baseball) (born 1951), broadcaster for the Atlanta Braves since 1992 and former baseball player
Joseph Simpson (cricketer) (born 1958), Guyanese cricketer
Joe Simpson, American music manager and reality television producer, and the father of Ashlee and Jessica Simpson
Joe Simpson (mountaineer) (born 1960), English mountaineer and author of many books including Touching the Void
Joe Simpson (artist) (born 1984), English artist best known for cinematic oil paintings
Joe Simpson (rugby union, born 1988), Australian-born English rugby union player